Gumbaz ("gonbad" [dome]) is a village in Khyber Pakhtunkhwa province of Pakistan. It is located at 35°44'16N 71°47'3E with an altitude of 1598 metres (5246 feet).

References

Villages in Khyber Pakhtunkhwa